The rusty-browed warbling finch (Microspingus erythrophrys) is a species of bird in the family Thraupidae.
It is found in Argentina and Bolivia.
Its natural habitat is subtropical or tropical moist montane forests.

References

rusty-browed warbling finch
Birds of the Yungas
rusty-browed warbling finch
rusty-browed warbling finch
Taxonomy articles created by Polbot